Jonathan Grayshon (born 10 May 1983) is an English former professional rugby league footballer.

Background
Grayshon was born in Bradford, West Yorkshire, England.

Career
Grayshon played for the Featherstone Rovers where he was signed from the Harlequins RL in the Super League. Grayshon has formerly played for the Huddersfield Giants and the Batley Bulldogs. In 2009 he spent most of the year on loan at the Widnes Vikings.

During Grayshon's start to his Harlequins RL career, he became a fans favourite. He was noted for his workrate and carries. As a lean and gangly figure he makes go forwards and is a defender. He also has got a turn of pace for a big man.

References

External links

(archived by web.archive.org) Profile at featherstonerovers.net
 Quins RL profile
(archived by web.archive.org) Always seems to be a lot of movement for the London club
(archived by web.archive.org) Quins land young British trio
 Injury-hit Giants turn to youth
(archived by web.archive.org) 2005-06 Season Statistics

1983 births
Living people
Batley Bulldogs players
English rugby league players
Featherstone Rovers players
Huddersfield Giants players
London Broncos players
Rugby league players from Bradford
Rugby league props
Rugby league second-rows
Whitehaven R.L.F.C. players
Widnes Vikings players